Minnal Veeran is a 1959 Indian Tamil-language action adventure film directed by Jampana. The film stars Ranjan and Sandhya. It was released on 20 March 1959.

Cast 
 Ranjan
 Sandhya
 P. S. Veerappa
 K. R. Ramsingh

Production 
Minnal Veeran was directed by Jampana, and produced by R. Kalyanaraman under T. N. R. Productions. The story and dialogue were written by A. L. Narayanan. Cinematography was handled by S. J. Thomas and W. R. Subba Rao. While mainly in black and white, the film also featured some colour sequences.

Soundtrack 
The music was composed by Vedha, and the lyrics were written by A. L. Narayanan, R. Palanisamy, Thanjai N. Ramaiah Dass and A. Maruthakasi.Playback singers are Seerkazhi Govindarajan, P. B. Sreenivas, S. C. Krishnan, C. Thangkappan, Radha Jayalakshmi, M. L. Vasanthakumari, P. Leela, T. V. Rathnam, A. G. Rathnamala, K. Jamuna Rani & G. Kasthuri.

Release and reception 
Minnal Veeran was released on 20 March 1959, and failed commercially.

References

External links 
 

1950s action adventure films
1950s Tamil-language films
Indian action adventure films
Films directed by Jampana
Films scored by Vedha (composer)